The National Cycle Network (NCN) was established to encourage cycling and walking throughout Britain, as well as for the purposes of bicycle touring. It was created by the charity Sustrans who were aided by a £42.5 million National Lottery grant. However Sustrans themselves only own around 2% of the paths on the network, these rest being made of existing public highways and rights of way, and permissive paths negotiated by Sustrans with private landowners, which Sustrans have then labelled as part of their network.  

In 2017, the Network was used for over 786 million cycling and walking trips, made by 4.4 million people. 

In 2020, around a quarter the NCN was scrapped on safety grounds, leaving  of signed routes. It uses shared use paths, disused railways, minor roads, canal towpaths and traffic-calmed routes in towns and cities.

History
The Bristol and Bath Railway Path (now part of National Route 4) is a  walking and cycling path on a disused railway. It opened in 1984 and was the first part of what would later become the NCN.

The National Cycle Network began with a National Lottery Grant from the 
Millennium Commission 
in 1995.
The original goal was to create  of signposted cycle routes by 2005, with 50% of these not being on roads, and all of it being "suitable for an unsupervised twelve year old." August 2005 saw the completion of that goal.

In 2018, Sustrans published the National Cycle Network - Paths for Everyone report which reviewed the quality and usage of the Network and set out a vision for its future. The report rated 42% of the then network as 'very poor' and identified over 12,000 barriers on the network which made it inaccessible by some users. As a result, around a quarter of the network was de-designated.

Routes

National routes
There are ten main national routes.  they are not all complete.

Route 1: Dover –  Tain. Running the length of the east coast and passing through London and Edinburgh. 
Route 2: Dover – St Austell in England, along the south coast.
Route 3: Bristol – Land's End, incorporating the West Country Way via Chew Valley Lake, and the Cornish Way
Route 4: London (Greenwich) – Fishguard, in West Wales, via Reading, Bath, Bristol, Newport, Caerphilly, Pontypridd, Swansea and Llanelli.
Route 5: Reading – Holyhead, via Birmingham, The Midlands and the North Wales coast
Route 6: Windsor – Lake District, running in sections via Luton, Milton Keynes, Northampton, Derby, Nottingham, Sheffield, Manchester and Preston crossing the Pennine Cycleway
Route 7: Sunderland – Inverness via Glasgow.
Route 8: Cardiff – Holyhead, through the heart of Wales.
Route 9: Belfast – Newry in sections of traffic-free route, with the major sections being between Belfast and Lisburn, and Craigavon and Newry
Route 10: Tynemouth — Cockermouth.  Roughly parallel to the C2C / Sea to Sea Cycle Route and Hadrian's Cycleway. It is a branch of National Route 1.

Numbering system
NCN routes beginning with numbers 1 to 6 are generally in England, routes beginning with a 7 start in Scotland and northern England, routes beginning with an 8 are generally in Wales, and routes beginning with a 9 are in Northern Ireland. The main route numbers have one digit (1 to 6 radiate clockwise from the south of England); other routes have two digits, starting with the number of the relevant main route.

There are also many shorter routes, reaching smaller towns and cities, that have three-digit numbers. Again, the route numbers start with the number of the main route for that region. For example, the Great North Cycleway in northern England has route number 725. Signs showed the route numbers on a blue background. Routes have been progressively renumbered with three-digit national numbers.

Some routes are numbered to match the motorways and major roads that connect the same destinations; examples include National Route 62, which by connecting the two sides of the Pennines mirrors the M62 motorway.

Signage

The network is signposted using a white bicycle symbol (and on some routes, walking) on a blue background, with an inset box showing a white route number on a red background. In general, signs do not show destinations or distances. On some older signs, regional route numbers have a blue background instead. The system of symbols is based on that used by the Danish National Cycle Route network.

Mileposts

One thousand "Millennium Mileposts" made from cast iron were funded by the Royal Bank of Scotland to mark the creation of the National Cycle Network, and these are found along the NCN routes throughout the UK. Following the de-designation of approximately a quarter of the NCN in 2020, a significant number of the mileposts are now orphaned from their intended routes.

There are four different types: "Fossil Tree" (designed by John Mills), "The Cockerel" (designed by Iain McColl), "Rowe Type" (designed by Andrew Rowe), and "Tracks" (designed by David Dudgeon). The four artists are from each country of the UK, though all posts can be found in all four countries.

Most mileposts contain a disk featuring symbols and text in code. There are 60 different designs, spread across the country. They form part of the Millennium Time Trail, a treasure hunt puzzle created by Sustrans in 2001.

The Verse held within the coded text is:

See also
The National Byway, an alternative  sign-posted cycle network around Britain
List of routes in Zone 4 of the National Cycle Network
List of routes in Zone 8 of the National Cycle Network

References

Further reading
Sustrans, 2002. The Official Guide To The National Cycle Network, 2nd ed. Italy: Canile & Turin. .

External links

Sustrans' interactive map of the National Cycle Network
OpenCycleMap.org Worldwide cycle map based on OpenStreetMap data
Google Street View used to discover 'lost' cycle ways (BBC, 2017)

 
Cycling infrastructure in the United Kingdom
United Kingdom